Coptops pardalis is a species of beetle in the family Cerambycidae. It was described by Francis Polkinghorne Pascoe in 1862, originally under the genus Abryna. It is known from Moluccas.

References

pardalis
Beetles described in 1862